Robert Vincent "Bob" Jury (born October 5, 1955) is a former American football defensive back who played one season with the San Francisco 49ers of the National Football League (NFL). He was drafted by the Seattle Seahawks in the third round of the 1978 NFL Draft. Jury played college football at the University of Pittsburgh and attended South Park High School in South Park, Pennsylvania. He was a consensus All-American in 1977. He is the Pittsburgh Panthers all-time leaders in interceptions (21), interceptions in a season (10) and interception return yards (266).

References

External links
Just Sports Stats

Living people
1955 births
Players of American football from Los Angeles
American football defensive backs
Pittsburgh Panthers football players
San Francisco 49ers players
All-American college football players